Two Timid Souls (French: Les deux timides) is a 1943 French historical comedy film directed by Yves Allégret, Marcel Achard and Marc Allégret and starring Pierre Brasseur, Jacqueline Laurent and Claude Dauphin. It was based on the 1860 play by Eugène Labiche which had previously been turned into a 1928 silent film version by René Clair.

The film's sets were designed by the art director Paul Bertrand.

Cast

References

Bibliography 
 Dayna Oscherwitz & MaryEllen Higgins. The A to Z of French Cinema. Scarecrow Press, 2009.

External links 
 

1943 films
1940s French-language films
Films directed by Yves Allégret
Films directed by Marc Allégret
Films directed by Marcel Achard
French films based on plays
Films set in the 19th century
French historical comedy films
1940s historical comedy films
Remakes of French films
Sound film remakes of silent films
French black-and-white films
1940s French films